The Killing House is a 1997 thriller novel. It is the final novel of the British writer Derek Lambert and features a plot set against the backdrop of the Northern Irish peace process.

References

Bibliography
 Burton, Alan. Historical Dictionary of British Spy Fiction. Rowman & Littlefield, 2016.

1997 British novels
Novels by Derek Lambert
British thriller novels